The Samuel Ireland House is a historic house in Somerville, Massachusetts. It is a -story vernacular cottage, five bays wide, with a side gable roof pierced by two dormers, and a projecting gable-roofed vestibule at the center of its front facade. The house was built c. 1792 by Samuel Ireland, a farmer. It is the oldest documented house in eastern Somerville, and one of the oldest in the city.

The house was listed on the National Register of Historic Places in 1989.

See also
National Register of Historic Places listings in Somerville, Massachusetts

References

Houses on the National Register of Historic Places in Somerville, Massachusetts